Percival Victor 'Perce' Pritchard (1925-2012) was an Australian rugby league footballer who played in the 1940s and 1950s.

Perce 'Peblo' Pritchard was a halfback from the South Newcastle club and represented New South Wales in 1947 before transferring to the Manly-Warringah Sea Eagles in 1950. Prichard played two seasons with Manly between 1950-1951 before returning to Merewether, New South Wales. He also represented New South Wales again in 1950, and captained Manly during his time at the club but ultimately lost his first grade position to a young Ken Arthurson.

Pritchard died on 19 March 2012, at Wallsend, New South Wales aged 86.

References

Manly Warringah Sea Eagles players
Manly Warringah Sea Eagles captains
New South Wales rugby league team players
Australian rugby league players
1925 births
2012 deaths
Rugby league players from Newcastle, New South Wales
Rugby league halfbacks